Solenn Colléter is a French novelist born in Paris in 1974.

Biography 

Graduate from École nationale de l'aviation civile ("French civil aviation university" ; promotion 1993), she is aerospace engineer in Toulouse and lives in a commune of Aude department.
She is the author of Je suis morte et je n’ai rein appris ("I am dead and I learned nothing" ; Éditions Albin Michel) relating to hazing in university studies.

Bibliography

 Solenn Colléter, Lettres de sang sur la côte sauvage, Alain Bargain, 2005, 541 p.
 Solenn Colléter, Je suis morte et je n'ai rien appris, Albin Michel, 2007, 359 p.

References

External links 
Solenn Colléter on Albin Michel website

21st-century French non-fiction writers
1974 births
Living people
École nationale de l'aviation civile alumni
French aerospace engineers
21st-century French women writers